John Munden was a rear-admiral in the Royal Navy (c.1645–1719).

John Munden may also refer to:

 John Munden, an English Catholic priest executed with George Haydock in 1584
John Munden, namesake of Munden, Kansas